Colocolo, colo-colo,  Colo-Colo, or Colo Colo may refer to:
 Colocolo (tribal chief), 16th century Mapuche leader and Chilean folk hero. 
 Colo Colo (mythology), evil rat-like creature from Mapuche mythology. 
 Colocolo (Leopardus colocolo), a South American cat native to Chile.
 Colo-Colo, a football team from Macul, Santiago, Chile.
 Colo Colo de Futebol e Regatas, a football team from Ilhéus, Bahia, Brazil.
 Colo-colo (condiment),  hot and spicy condiment the cuisine of the Maluku archipelago, Indonesia.
 Colocolo opossum (Dromiciops gliroides), or monito del monte, a South American marsupial.
 Qulu Qulu, Hispanicized Colo Colo, an archaeological site in Peru
 Chilean ship Colo Colo various

See also
 Colo (disambiguation)